Tigershark is a defunct subsidiary of Arctic Cat that produced personal watercraft (PWC) from 1993 until 1999. Tigershark PWCs were designed to be light, sporty and inexpensive, but early models had a reputation for poor build quality, and the brand suffered, despite significant improvements with the introduction of the 1997 models. The line was introduced in 1993 as a singular Tigershark model. Across seven years, the brand would consist of 20 offerings between two unique hull designs, three various lengths, and two engines in various trim and sizes.

The initial hull design, referred to as the Tigershark Hull, was offered in three lengths, a sporty 8', more comfortable 9', and two passenger 10'. In 1998, Tigershark released their abbreviated TS Hull. This was available in a 9' and two passenger 10' lengths. Engine configurations included a  liquid-cooled two-stroke Twin, or  liquid-cooled two-stroke Triples across the line.

Models

Tigershark Hull design
Barracuda (1994-1995) An 8', 385 lbs (Dry Weight) Model featuring a 72Hp 639cc Suzuki Twin 
Daytona (1994-1995) A 9', 410 lbs (Dry Weight) Model featuring a 72Hp 639cc Suzuki Twin
Daytona 1000 770 (1996-1997) A 9', 410 lbs (Dry Weight) Model featuring a 90Hp 639cc Suzuki Twin
Daytona 1000 (1997) A 9', 515 lbs (Dry Weight) Model featuring a 115Hp 999cc Suzuki Triple
Monte Carlo/640 (1994-1997) A 10', Two-passenger 560 lbs (Dry Weight) Model featuring a 62Hp 639cc Suzuki Twin
Monte Carlo 770 (1996-1997) A 10', Two-passenger 560 lbs (Dry Weight) Model featuring a 90Hp 768cc Suzuki Twin
Monte Carlo 900 (1996) A 10', Two-passenger 645 lbs (Dry Weight) Model featuring a 105Hp 896cc Suzuki Triple
Monte Carlo1000 (1997) A 10', Two-passenger 645 lbs (Dry Weight) Model featuring a 115Hp 999cc Suzuki Triple
Montego (1994-1997) A 9', 415 lbs (Dry Weight) Model featuring a 62Hp 639cc Suzuki Twin
94 montego engine i have is a 644cc not 639cc like my 94 Daytona butthe Daytona has a larger carb flange on intake with reverse on foot**
Montego DX/Deluxe (1994-1997) A 10', Two-passenger 645 lbs (Dry Weight) Model featuring a 62Hp 639cc Suzuki Twin
Tigershark (1993) A 9', 410 lbs (Dry Weight) Model featuring a 62Hp 639cc Suzuki Twin
Tigershark 900 (1995) A 10', Two-passenger 645 lbs (Dry Weight) Model featuring a 100Hp 896cc Suzuki Triple

TS Hull design
TS 640 (1998-1999) A 9', 405 lbs (Dry Weight) Model featuring a 62Hp 639cc Suzuki Twin
TS 640L (1998) A 10', Two-passenger 540 lbs (Dry Weight) Model featuring a 62Hp 639cc Suzuki Triple
TS 770 (1998-1999) A 9', 412 lbs (Dry Weight) Model featuring a 80Hp 768cc Suzuki Twin
TS 770L (1998-1999) A 10', Two-passenger 560 lbs (Dry Weight) Model featuring a 90Hp 768cc Suzuki Triple
TS 770R (1998) A 9', 470 lbs (Dry Weight) Model featuring a 90Hp 768cc Suzuki Twin
TS 900L (1998) A 10', Two-passenger 645 lbs (Dry Weight) Model featuring a 105Hp 999cc Suzuki Triple
TS 1000L/LI (1998-1999) A 10', Two-passenger 645 lbs (Dry Weight) Model featuring a 115 hp(L)/120Hp(LI) 999cc Suzuki Triple
TS 1000R (1998) A 9', 515 lbs (Dry Weight) Model featuring a 115Hp 999cc Suzuki Triple
TS 1100R (1999) A 9', Two-passenger 550 lbs (Dry Weight) Model featuring a 135Hp 1100cc Suzuki Triple

Spirit Marine
Parent company Arctic Cat had attempted one previous foray into Water Sports, with subsidiary Spirit Marine. In 1978 they brought the Wetbike to the market, a straddled planing watercraft. A variation would be seen in the James Bond movie, The Spy who Loved Me, ridden by star Roger Moore. The machine was built by Spirit Marine and various licensed manufacturers until 1992.

Lawsuit

In 2016, Tigershark was awarded $46.7 million for patent infringements related to off-throttle assisted steering technology. Initially awarded $15.5million by jury in the U.S District Court for the Southern District of Florida, a Judge ordered Triple Damages days later. The Jury voted unanimously against the defendant, citing willful infringement of all asserted claims.

References

Personal water craft
Products introduced in 1994